The Roman Catholic Diocese of Churchill–Hudson Bay (French Diocèse de Churchill–Baie d’Hudson) is a Latin Catholic suffragan diocese in the ecclesiastical province of the Metropolitan Roman Catholic Archdiocese of Keewatin–Le Pas.

Its cathedral episcopal see is the Cathédrale Saints-Martyrs-Canadiens-et-Reine-des-Martyrs, dedicated to the Canadian Martyrs and the Queen of Martyrs, in Churchill, Manitoba.

History 
 Established on 1925.07.15 as Apostolic Prefecture of Hudson Bay (English) / Baie d’Hudson (French) / Sinus de Hudson (Latin), on territory split off from Apostolic Vicariate of Keewatin (now its Metropolitan)
 Promoted on 1931.12.21 as Apostolic Vicariate of Hudson Bay (English) / Baie d’Hudson / Sinus de Hudson (Latin)
 Lost territory on 1945.07.13 to establish the then Apostolic Vicariate of Labrador
 Promoted on 1967.07.13 as Diocese of Churchill / Churchillpolitan(us) (Latin)
 Renamed on 1968.01.29 as Diocese of Churchill–Hudson Bay (English) / Churchill–Baie d’Hudson / Churchillpolitan(us)–Sinus de Hudson (Latin).

Statistics and extent 
As per 2014, it pastorally served 10,370 Catholics (30.5% of 34,023 total) on 2,300,000 km2 in 13 parishes and 8 missions with 3 priests (diocesan), 1 deacon and 2 lay religious (2 sisters).

It includes the northeastern part of the federal Province of Manitoba and all except the western extremity of the Territory of Nunavut.

As of 2004, the diocese had 17 parishes, 7 religious priests and 7,900 Catholics, 2 Women Religious, 8 Religious Brothers and 1 permanent deacon.

Bishops

Ordinaries 
(all Roman Rite)

Apostolic Prefect of Hudson Bay
 Fr. Louis-Eugène-Arsène Turquetil, Missionary Oblates of Mary Immaculate (born France) (O.M.I.) (1925.07.15 – 1931.12.15 see below)

Apostolic Vicars of Churchill-Hudson Bay
 Louis-Eugène-Arsène Turquetil (see above 1931.12.15 – retired 1942.12.18), Titular Bishop of Ptolemais in Phœnicia (1931.12.15 – death 1955.06.14)
 Marc Lacroix, O.M.I. (first Canadian incumbent) (1942.12.18 – 1967.07.13 see below), Titular Bishop of Rhosus (1942.12.18 – 1967.07.13)

Suffragan Bishops of Churchill
 Marc Lacroix (see above 1967.07.13 – 1968.01.29 see below)

Suffragan Bishops of Churchill-Hudson Bay
 Marc Lacroix (see above 1968.01.29 – retired 1968.10.25), emeritate as Titular Bishop of Chullu (1968.10.25 – resigned 1970.11.24), died 1976
 Omer Alfred Robidoux (1970.03.07 – death 1986.11.12)
 Reynald Rouleau (1987.05.15 – retired 2013.02.16)
 Wiesław Krótki (born Poland) (16 February 2013 - ... ).

Coadjutor bishop
 Armand Clabaut, O.M.I. (1937-1940), as Coadjutor Vicar Apostolic; did not succeed to see

See also 

 List of Catholic dioceses in Canada

References 
 GCatholic, with Google map and satellite photo - data for all sections
 Diocese of Churchill-Baie d'Hudson page at catholichierarchy.org retrieved July 18, 2006

External links 
 

Roman Catholic Ecclesiastical Province of Keewatin–Le Pas
Catholic Church in Manitoba
1925 establishments in Canada